Polyommatus abdon is a butterfly of the family Lycaenidae. It was described by Eyjolf Aistleitner and Ulrich Aistleitner in 1994. It is found in Spain.

References

Butterflies described in 1994
Polyommatus
Butterflies of Europe